La Blanca is a municipality in the San Marcos department of Guatemala on the Pacific Ocean shore. It was created on 23 January 2014, when it was split from Ocos, along with Chiquirines and Pueblo Nuevo villages and became San Marcos Department thirtieth municipality. When created in 2014, La Blanca had about 25,000 inhabitants.

Climate

La Blanca has tropical climate (Köppen:Cwb).

Geographic location

See also

 La Aurora International Airport
 Tapachula International Airport

References 

Municipalities of the San Marcos Department